Dirty Deeds is a 2005 American comedy film directed by David Kendall, produced by Bill Civitella and Dan Kaplow; written by Jon Land and Jonathan Thies. It was released on August 25, 2005, in the United States and filmed in Los Angeles, California.

Plot
High-school student Zach Harper sets out to complete the "Dirty Deeds", an outrageous list of ten challenges that must be completed between dusk and dawn on the Friday night of his high school's homecoming weekend. The only student to complete the entire list, Duncan Rime, did so in 1989 when only 8 tasks comprised the list. Rime later reveals that whenever someone completes the entire list, more are added to it.

Zach attempts to complete the deeds for a classmate, the beautiful Meg Cummings. Meg's younger brother, Kyle, wants to do the challenge to earn the respect of the school's jocks, who are constantly bullying him. Meg is concerned for her brother, and she insists that Zach stop him from trying to do something so foolish. While Meg had no intention of Zach attempting the deeds in place of her brother, Zach decides to take on the challenge.

The night begins, and Zach easily checks off the first item on the list—drink beer in front of the cops—by pouring a beer into a coffee cup and consuming it in front of them. This way, the cops, who are determined to stop all those who attempt the deeds, have no idea of Zach's intentions of completing the list. As Zach attempts the nine remaining deeds, the jocks do everything in their power to prevent him from completing it. Throughout his crazy night, Zach enlists the help of those around him to accomplish the difficult tasks. Along the way, Zach meets Duncan Rime who tries to warn him about how hollow the victory can be. Afterwards, Zach refuses to continue, but Dan and JD (the tough kid from Deed #2) decide to try to ruin the carnival so that Zach will be blamed. With some last-minute help from Vincent Scarno (the owner of the car from Deed #8), Zach is able to turn the tables in time. In the midst of everything, Zach and Meg begin to develop feelings for each other, and Zach and Meg end up falling in love over the list of "Dirty Deeds".

Cast
 Milo Ventimiglia as Zach Harper
 Lacey Chabert as Meg Cummings
 Tom Amandes as Vice Principal Lester Fuchs
 Matthew Carey as Dan Lawton
 Wes Robinson as Kyle Cummings
 Mark Derwin as Vincent Scarno
 Charles Durning as Victor Rasdale
 Michael Milhoan as Officer Dill
 Keith Britton as Officer Bevins
 Billy L. Sullivan as Stash
 Zoe Saldana as Rachel Buff
 Arielle Kebbel as Alison
 Ray Santiago as Bobby D
 Erin Torpey as Jen, Dan's girlfriend
 Alex Solowitz as JD Riplock
 Danso Gordon as Biggs
 Todd Zeile as Mullet / Duncan Rime
 Fred Meyers as Lockett
 Charles Noland as Blind Man
 Patrick Tatten as Student
 Brett Tabisel as Stick

Music
The following were some of the songs featured in the film.
 Bowling for Soup – “Almost”
 The Beatles – "She Loves You"
 Uptown Sinclair – “Face Down”
 Valley Lodge – “If It Takes All Night”
 The SmashUp – “Icarus Flies”
 Alex Solowitz – “Take it and Shove it”
 Bryan Datillo – “ICGM (Italian Click Gang Mafiosa)”
 Grace & Manners – “9 By 9”

References

External links
 
 
 

2000s sex comedy films
2005 films
American sex comedy films
American teen comedy films
2000s English-language films
Films shot in Los Angeles
American independent films
2005 comedy films
2000s American films